The 1995 Merdeka Tournament was held from 17 July to 2 August 1995 in Malaysia.

Group stage

Group A

Group B

Knockout stage

Semifinals

Final

References

Merdeka Cup